The non-marine molluscs of Iran are a part of the molluscan fauna of Iran, which is part of the (wildlife of Iran).

Freshwater gastropods 
27 freshwater gastropod species (37% of freshwater gastropod species in Iran) are endemic to Iran.

Species of freshwater gastropods of Iran include:

Neritidae
 Neritina mesopotamica Martens 1879 - the first report in Iran was in 2001
 Neritina cinctellus (Martens, 1874)
 Neritina euphratica Mousson, 1874
 Theodoxus jordani (Sowerby I, 1836)
 Theodoxus major Issel, 1865 - mentioned by Glöer & Pešić (2012) as Theodoxus lituratus (Eichwald, 1838)
 Theodoxus pallidus Dunker, 1861

Viviparidae
 Bellamya bengalensis (Lamarck, 1822)
 Bellamya hilmandensis (Kobelt, 1909)

Melanopsidae
 Melanopsis costata (Olivier, 1804)
 Melanopsis doriae Issel, 1865
 Melanopsis kotschyi Philippi, 1847
 Melanopsis sp. - Mansoorian (2001) listed Melanopsis from Iran as Melanopsis nodosa Mousson, 1874 and as Melanopsis praemorsa (Linnaeus, 1758), but Glöer and Pešić (2012) claimed that there are nine possible names for this species and that further study is necessary to establish under which name or names the Iranian populations should be placed.

Potamididae
 Cerithidea cingulata (Gmelin, 1790)

Thiaridae
 Thiara scabra (O.F. Müller, 1774)
 Melanoides tuberculata (O. F. Müller, 1774)

Bithyniidae
 Bithynia tentaculata (Linnaeus, 1758) - This species most probably does not occur in Iran.
 Bithynia forcarti Glöer & Pešić, 2012
 Bithynia starmuehlneri Glöer & Pešić, 2012
 Bithynia mazandaranensis Glöer & Pešić, 2012
 Bithynia cf. ejecta Mousson, 1874
 Bithynia rubens (Menke, 1830) - questionable taxonomic status
 Bithynia sistanica (Annandale & Prashad, 1919)
 Pseudobithynia irana Glöer & Pešić, 2006
 Pseudobithynia zagrosia Glöer & Pešić, 2009

Cochliopidae
 Heleobia dalmatica (Radoman, 1974)

Hydrobiidae
 Hydrobia acuta (Draparnaud, 1805)
 Ecrobia grimmi (Clessin & Dybowski, 1888)
 Pseudamnicola kotschyi von Frauenfeld, 1863
 Pseudamnicola saboori Glöer & Pešić, 2009
 Pseudamnicola zagrosensis Glöer & Pešić, 2009
 Pseudamnicola raddei Boettger, 1889
 Pseudamnicola georgievi Glöer & Pešić, 2012
 Kaskakia khorrasanensis Glöer & Pešić, 2012
 Sarkhia sarabensis Glöer & Pešić, 2012
 Sarkhia kermanshahensis (Glöer & Pešić, 2009)
 Belgrandiella elburensis (Starmühlner & Edlauer, 1957)
 Hauffenia erythropomatia (Hauffen, 1856)

Moitessieridae
 Trogloiranica tashanica Fatemil, Malek-Hosseini, Falniowski, Hofman, Kuntner & Grego, 2019

Stenothyridae
 Stenothyra arabica Neubert, 1998
 Gangetia uzielliana (Issel, 1866)
 Farsithyra farsensis Glöer & Pešić, 2009

Valvatidae
 Valvata cristata O. F. Müller, 1774
 Valvata piscinalis O. F. Müller, 1774
 Valvata nowshahrensis Glöer & Pešić, 2012

Acroloxidae
 Acroloxus pseudolacustris Glöer & Pešić, 2012

Lymnaeidae
 Radix persica (Issel, 1865)
 Radix auricularia (Linnaeus, 1785) - Radix auricularia gedrosiana Annandale & Prashad, 1919
 Radix bactriana (Annandale & Prashad, 1919)
 Radix iranica (Annandale & Prashad, 1919)
 Radix gedrosiana (Annandale & Prashad, 1919) - Radix gedrosiana gedrosiana (Annandale & Prashad, 1919). Radix gedrosiana rectilabrum is endemic to Iran.
 Radix hordeum (Mousson, 1874)
 Radix labiata (Rossmaessler, 1835)
 Galba truncatula (Müller, 1774)
 Galba schirazensis Küster, 1862
 Stagnicola sp. - Most probably, the species reported from Iran as Stagnicola palustris represents an undescribed species. It is not possible to identify or eventually describe this species according to shells only as new to science without anatomical studies.
 Lymnaea stagnalis (Linnaeus, 1774)

Doubtful Lymnaeidae:
 Radix lagotis (Schrank, 1803) - It was recorded from Iran by Martens (1874) and by Biggs (1937), but this species most probably does not occur in Iran.

Planorbidae
 Bulinus truncatus (Audouin, 1827)
 Planorbis intermixtus Mousson, 1874
 Planorbis carinatus O. F. Müller, 1774
 Anisus leucostoma (Millet, 1813)
 Anisus spirorbis (Linnaeus, 1758)
 Anisus sp. - shells similar to Anisus vorticulus
 Anisus vortex (Linnaeus, 1758)
 Gyraulus piscinarum (Bourguignat, 1852)
 Gyraulus euphraticus (Mousson, 1874)
 Gyraulus convexiusculus (Hutton, 1849)
 Gyraulus laevis (Alder, 1838)
 Indoplanorbis exustus (Deshayes, 1834)
 Hippeutis complanatus (Linnaeus, 1758) - the first report in Iran was in 2012
 Segmentina calatha (Benson, 1850)
 Ferrissia isseli (Bourguignat, 1866)

Physidae
 Physella acuta (Draparnaud, 1805)

Freshwater species excluded from the list:
 Theodoxus fluviatilis (Linnaeus, 1758) - It was listed by Glöer & Pešić (2012) from Iran. But Sands et al. (2012) found no evidence for the occurrence of this species.
 Bithynia badiella (Küster, 1852)
 Bithynia troschelii (Pasch, 1842)
 Acroloxus lacustris (Linnaeus, 1758) - It was recorded by Lothar Forcart in 1935. But an analysis of the two specimens from Forcart’s collection (NMB 11516a) identified as Acroloxus lacustris from Mazandaran Province shows that these specimens belong to Acroloxus pseudolacustris.

Land gastropods 

Species of land gastropods of Iran include:

Aciculidae
 Acicula persica Subai, 1981

Cyclophoridae
 Caspicyclotus sieversi (L. Pfeiffer, 1871)

Pomatiidae
 Pomatias rivularis hyrcanus (E. von Martens, 1874)

Carychiidae
 Carychium lederi O. Boettger, 1880
 Carychium minimum O. Boettger, 1880

Succineidae
 Oxyloma "pfeifferi" 
 Succinea putris (Linnaeus, 1758)

Cochlicopidae
 Cochlicopa lubrica (O.F. Müller, 1774)

Enidae
 Buliminus alepensis (L. Pfeiffer, 1842)
 Buliminus zarudnyi Lindholm, 1915
 Chondrula tridens (O.F. Müller, 1774)
 Geminula continens carmanica (Forcart, 1959)
 Geminula continens continens (Rosen, 1892)
 Geminula continens parthica (Forcart, 1959)
 Geminula didymodus (O. Boettger, 1880)
 Geminula dolmenensis Bank & Neubert, 2016
 Geminula ghilanensis (Issel, 1865)
 Geminula isseliana (Bourguignat, 1865)
 Geminula pyramidata Bank & Neubert, 2016
 Geminula urmiensis Bank & Neubert, 2016
 Georginapaeus hohenackeri (L. Pfeiffer, 1848)
 Iranopsis carducha (E. von Martens, 1874)
 Iranopsis granulata Bank & Neubert, 2016
 Ljudmilena sieversi (Mousson, 1873)
 Merdigera obscura (O.F. Müller, 1774)
 Multidentula pupoides (Krynicki, 183)
 Multidentula ridens (Nägele, 1906)
 Ottorosenia varenzovi (Rosen, 1893)
 Pseudochondrula arsaci Bank & Neubert, 2016
 Pseudochondrula bondouxi Bank & Neubert, 2016
 Pseudochondrula darii Bank & Neubert, 2016
 Pseudochondrula orientalis Bank & Neubert, 2016
 Pseudochondrula purus Bank & Neubert, 2016
 Pseudochondrula seductilis scapa Bank & Neubert, 2016
 Pseudochondrula tetrodon Bank & Neubert, 2016
 Pseudonapaeus alborsicus Bank & Neubert, 2016
 Pseudonapaeus asterabadensis (Kobelt, 1880)
 Pseudonapaeus blanfordianus (Kobelt, 1880)
 Pseudonapaeus demorgani Bank & Neubert, 2016
 Pseudonapaeus fusiformis Bank & Neubert, 2016
 Pseudonapaeus geoffreyi (Ancey, 1884)
 Pseudonapaeus hyrcanus (Lindholm, 1915)
 Pseudonapaeus ignoratus Bank & Neubert, 2016
 Pseudonapaeus kermanensis Bank & Neubert, 2016
 Pseudonapaeus menkhorsti Bank & Neubert, 2016
 Pseudonapaeus minutus Bank & Neubert, 2016
 Pseudonapaeus orculoides Bank & Neubert, 2016
 Pseudonapaeus schahrudensis (O. Boettger, 1889)
 Pseudonapaeus sogdianus (E. von Martens, 1874)
 Turanena herzi (O. Boettger, 1889)
 Turanena pseudobscura Bank & Neubert, 2016

Chondrinidae
 Granopupa granum (Draparnaud, 1801)
 Granopupa persica (Gittenberger, 1973)

Gastrocoptidae
 Gastrocopta armigerella (Reinhardt, 1877)

Lauriidae
 Lauria cylindracea (Da Costa, 1778)
 Leiostyla iranica Gittenberger & Pieper, 1988

Orculidae
 Orculella pfeiferi Hausdorf, 1996
 Orculella ruderalis persica Hausdorf, 1996
 Orculella sirianocoriensis libanotica (Tristram, 1865)
 Pagodulina lederi hyrcanica Gittenberger & Pieper, 1984
 Pagodulina lederi lederi Gittenberger & Pieper, 1984
 Schileykula scyphus crassa (Pilsbry, 1922)
 Sphyradium doliolum Hausdorf, 1996

Pupillidae
 Pupoides coenopictus (T. Hutton, 1834)

Truncatellinidae
 Truncatellina callicratis (Scacchi, 1833)

Valloniidae
 Vallonia costata (O.F. Müller, 1774)
 Vallonia pulchella (O.F. Müller, 1774)

Vertiginidae
 Vertigo angustior Jeffreys, 1830
 Vertigo antivertigo (Draparnaud, 1801)
 Vertigo pygmaea (Draparnaud, 1801)

Clausiliidae
 Euxina achrafensis Nordsieck, 1995
 Caspiophaedusa perlucens gilanensis Nordsieck, 1978
 Caspiophaedusa perlucens perlucens (O. Boettger, 1877)
 Euxina forcarti Nordsieck, 1995
 Euxina gastron Nordsieck, 1995
 Euxina lessonae (Issel, 1865)
 Euxina mazanderanica Nordsieck, 1995
 Euxina patrisnemethi Németh & Szekeres, 2004
 Euxina talyschana Likharev, 1962
 Laeviphaedusa hyrcanica (Germain, 1933)
 Likharevia gilanensis Nordsieck, 1995
 Microphaedusa morgani Nordsieck, 1978
 Mucronaria duboisi (Charpentier, 1852)
 Pravispira semilamellata (Mousson, 1863)
 Serrulina sieversi (L. Pfeiffer, 1871)
 Serrulinella senghanensis (Germain, 1933)

Achatinidae
 Cecilioides acicula (O.F. Müller, 1774)
 Cecilioides raddei (O. Boettger, 1879)
 Zootecus insularis (Ehrenberg, 1831)

Punctidae
 Punctum pygmaeum (Draparnaud, 1801)

Gastrodontidae
 Zonitoides nitidus (O.F. Müller, 1774)

Oxychilidae
 Aegopinella pura (Alder, 1830)
 Conulopolita sieversi (O. Boettger, 1879)
 Eopolita derbentina (O. Boettger, 1886)
 Gastranodon siaretanus (O. Boettger, 1889)
 Iranoxychilus herzi (O. Boettger, 1889)
 Oxychilus caspius caspius (O. Boettger, 1800)
 Oxychilus caspius disciformis Riedel, 1959
 Oxychilus concinnus (Krynicki, 1836)
 Oxychilus filicum (Krynicki, 1836)
 Oxychilus hobbit Riedel, 1981
 Oxychilus patulaeformis (O. Boettger, 1889)
 Oxychilus subeffusus (O. Boettger, 1879)
 Perpolita petronella (L. Pfeiffer, 1853)
 Schistophallus elegans (O. Boettger, 1881)
 Schistophallus hyrcanus (Riedel, 1981)

Pristilomatidae
 Vitrea contortula (Krynicki, 1837)
 Vitrea morgani Riedel, 1966
 Vitrea pygmaea (O. Boettger, 1880)
 Vitrea saboori Neubert & Bössneck, 2013

Parmacellidae
 Parmacella ibera (Draparnaud, 1801)

Trigonochlamydidae
 Hyrcanolestes velitaris (Martens, 1880)
 Parmacellilla filipowitschi Simroth, 1910

Agriolimacidae
 Deroceras spec. cf. bakurianum (Simroth, 1912)
 Deroceras caucasicum (Simroth, 1901)
 Krynickillus melanocephalus Kaleniczenko, 1851
 Lytopelte maculata (Koch et Heynemann, 1874)

Limacidae
 Caspilimax keyserlingi (E. von Martens, 1880)

Vitrinidae
 Oligolimax annularis (S. Studer, 1820)

Geomitridae
 Helicopsis aelleni Hausdorf, 1996
 Helicopsis persica Hausdorf & Bössneck, 2016
 Xeropicta krynickii  (Krynicki, 1833)

Helicidae
 Caucasotachea leucoranea (Mousson, 1863)
 Eobania vermiculata (O.F. Müller, 1774)
 Helix lucorum Linnaeus, 1758
 Helix salomonica Nägele, 1899
 Levantina ceratomma (L. Pfeiffer, 1856)
 Levantina djulfensis (Dubois de Montpéreux, 1840)
 Levantina ghilanica (Mousson, 1876)
 Levantina mahanica (Kobelt, 1910)
 Levantina mazenderanensis (Kobelt, 1883)

Hygromiidae
 Diplobursa pisiformis (L. Pfeiffer, 1846)
 Harmozica ravergiensis (Férussac, 1835)
 Monacha obstructa (L. Pfeiffer, 1842)
 Monacha syriaca (Ehrenberg, 1831)
 Stenomphalia selecta (Klika, 1894)

Freshwater bivalves
Species of freshwater bivalves of Iran include:

See also
 List of marine molluscs of Iran

Lists of molluscs of surrounding countries:
 List of non-marine molluscs of Armenia
 List of non-marine molluscs of Azerbaijan
 List of non-marine molluscs of Turkmenistan
 List of non-marine molluscs of Kazakhstan
 List of non-marine molluscs of Russia
 List of non-marine molluscs of Afghanistan
 List of non-marine molluscs of Pakistan
 List of non-marine molluscs of Iraq
 List of non-marine molluscs of Turkey

References
This article incorporates CC-BY-3.0 text from the reference

Further reading 
  Mansoorian A. (1986). "A practical guide to the identification of the freshwater snails of Iran". J. Pub. Hlth. 15(1-2): 41-53.
 Mansoorian A. (1994). "Freshwater snails of Iran, Technical series, No 2145, 1374". Scientific publication of School of Public Health & Institute of Public Health Research, P.O. Box 6446, Tehran 14155, Iran.
 Mansoorian A. & Edlinger K. (2001). "Some Terrestrial Snails from Northern Iran". In: abstract volume of Unitas Malacologica, 14th Congress, Vienna, 19–26 August 2001.
 Massoud J. & Hedayeti-Far M. (1979). "Freshwater Mollusk Fauna of the Khuzestan and Khorram-abad Areas in Southwestern Iran". Malacological Review 12: 96.

Molluscs

Moluscs
Iran
Iran